Pracuúba is a municipality located in the mideast of the state of Amapá in Brazil. It became an independent municipality in 1992. The town can be accessed from the BR-156 highway.

Location
The name of the municipality comes from a tree common to the area known as the pracuubeira. The economy of Pracuúba relies of artisanal fishing and raising livestock, primarily buffalo. It also produces timber and açaí.

Conservation
The municipality contains part of the  Lago Piratuba Biological Reserve, a fully protected conservation unit created in 1980.
It also contains 4.52% of the  Amapá State Forest, a sustainable use conservation unit established in 2006.
It contains 52.85% of the  Amapá National Forest, a sustainable use conservation unit created in 1989.

Cujubim

Cujubim is an agricultural village located in the municipality. Pedro Maciel Filho, a native of Cujubim, wanted a school in his village where agricultural techniques were taught. Filho donated land on which the school could be constructed. On 9 January 2021, the Pedro Maciel Filho School was opened in Cujubim.

References

External links 
 Official site (in Portuguese)

Municipalities in Amapá
Populated places in Amapá